Bergia is one of the two genera of plants composing the waterwort family, Elatinaceae. These are tropical to subtropical plants and sometimes aquatic in nature.

Species include:
Bergia ammannioides
Bergia aquatica
Bergia auriculata
Bergia capensis
Bergia decumbens
Bergia glutinosa
Bergia henshallii
Bergia pedicellaris
Bergia pentherana
Bergia perennis
Bergia polyantha
Bergia pusilla
Bergia serrata
Bergia suffruticosa
Bergia texana

References

External links
 Jepson Manual Treatment
 Bergia of Zimbabwe
 Bergia of Western Australia

Elatinaceae
Malpighiales genera